James R. Parr (born February 27, 1986) is an American former professional baseball pitcher. He pitched in Major League Baseball for the Atlanta Braves from 2008 to 2009.

Career
He was drafted in the fourth round, 131st overall pick, out of La Cueva High School in Albuquerque, New Mexico by the Atlanta Braves in the 2004 MLB Draft.

On September 4, 2008, Parr made his major league debut for the Braves. Parr pitched 6 innings, allowed no runs on 2 hits, and earned his first major league victory in the Braves 2-0 win against the Washington Nationals.

Atlanta manager Bobby Cox said of his debut, "What a night he had. He's sneaky quick. He doesn't light up the radar gun, but he's got a little looping curve and a changeup. I was impressed. It's a great way to break in."
Parr signed with the Gary SouthShore RailCats of the American Association of Independent Professional Baseball and played for them during the 2014 season.

Parr played for the Sugar Land Skeeters of the Atlantic League of Professional Baseball in 2015. He became a free agent after the 2015 season. In 2016, Parr founded Pro4mer, a business that sought to introduce young athletes to professionals.

References

External links

1986 births
Living people
Baseball players from Albuquerque, New Mexico
Major League Baseball pitchers
Gulf Coast Braves players
Rome Braves players
Myrtle Beach Pelicans players
Mississippi Braves players
Richmond Braves players
Atlanta Braves players
Gary SouthShore RailCats players
Bridgeport Bluefish players
Sugar Land Skeeters players
La Cueva High School alumni